The men's road race at the 1963 UCI Road World Championships was the 30th edition of the event. The race took place on Sunday 11 August 1963 in Ronse, Belgium. The race was won by Benoni Beheyt of Belgium.

Final classification

References

Men's Road Race
UCI Road World Championships – Men's road race
1963 Super Prestige Pernod